The Vandals / Assorted Jelly Beans is a split 7-inch record put out by Kung Fu Records in 1996. It was the first release to be put out by the label, which was founded by Vandals members Joe Escalante and Warren Fitzgerald for the purpose of releasing an album by the Huntington Beach band Assorted Jelly Beans. It is therefore appropriate that the label's first release is a split 7-inch with songs from the Vandals on one side and the Assorted Jelly Beans on the other.

The Assorted Jelly Beans' side of the record includes two songs that would later appear on their first album, also released by Kung Fu, as well as the song "Macho Man", which is exclusive to this release. The Vandals' side includes two covers of songs by other Huntington Beach bands, the Falling Idols and Supernova, as well as a playful instrumental reprise of the song "Happy Birthday to Me" from their 1995 album Live Fast, Diarrhea. The Falling Idols were a Huntington Beach punk rock band in the 1980s which featured Dave Quackenbush, who became the Vandals' singer in 1985, and Randy Bradbury, who became the bass player for Pennywise in 1996.

Track listing
Vandals side:
"Joe" [originally performed by the Falling Idols]
"Costa Mesa Hates Me" [originally performed by Supernova]
"Happy Birthday to Me (reprise)"
Assorted Jelly Beans side:
"8th Grade Nerd"
"Macho Man"
"No Time"

Performers
The Vandals:
Dave Quackenbush - vocals
Warren Fitzgerald - guitar
Joe Escalante - bass
Josh Freese - drums, vocals on "Costa Mesa Hates Me"
Assorted Jelly Beans:
Wylie Johnson - guitar, vocals
Ricky Boyer - bass, vocals
Ricky Falomir - drums, vocals

Album information
Record label: Kung Fu Records
The Vandals side:
Track 1 written by Randy Bradbury. Track 2 written by Art, Hank and Dave of Supernova. Track 3 written by Warren Fitzgerald.
Track 1 published by Greezy Coolman Music BMI. Tracks 2 and 3 published by Puppety Frenchman Music.
Assorted Jelly Beans side:
All songs written and published by Assorted Jelly Beans, copyright 1996.

References

The Vandals albums
1996 EPs
Assorted Jelly Beans albums
Split EPs
Kung Fu Records EPs